La Colère dans le vent is a 2016 Nigerien documentary film directed by Amina Weira and produced by VraiVrai Films. 

The film deals with the mining of uranium in Areva city since 1976 and resulted loss of population due to high radioactivity in that area.

The film premiered on 1 April 2016 in France. The film received mixed reviews from critics and screened at many film festivals.

References

External links 
 

Nigerien documentary films
2016 films
2016 documentary films